Trifurcula beirnei is a moth of the family Nepticulidae. It is found in Great Britain, Denmark and parts of Germany, Poland, Austria, the Czech Republic, Slovakia and Hungary. It is also found in the Volga and Ural region of Russia.

The wingspan is 8–11 mm. Adults are on wing from the end of June to late September.

The larvae feed on Genista species, including Genista tinctoria, Genista germanica and Genista pilosa.

External links
Nepticulidae from the Volga and Ural region
Fauna Europaea

Nepticulidae
Moths of Europe
Moths described in 1984